The Roy-LeBlanc House is a historic house located at 105 South St. Pierre Street in Broussard, Louisiana.

Built in 1886 by Joseph Arthur Roy for his wife Cornelia Bailey, the house is a frame one-and-a-half story Italianate house with two front dormers. The house was sold to J.G. LeBlanc in 1889.

The building was listed on the National Register of Historic Places on March 14, 1983.

It is one of 10 individually NRHP-listed houses in the "Broussard Multiple Resource Area", which also includes: 
Alesia House
Billeaud House
Martial Billeaud Jr. House
Valsin Broussard House 
Comeaux House
Ducrest Building
Janin Store 

St. Cecilia School 
St. Julien House 
Main Street Historic District

See also
 National Register of Historic Places listings in Lafayette Parish, Louisiana

References

Houses on the National Register of Historic Places in Louisiana
Italianate architecture in Louisiana
Houses completed in 1886
Lafayette Parish, Louisiana
National Register of Historic Places in Lafayette Parish, Louisiana